Jailson Marcelino dos Santos (born 20 July 1981), simply known as Jailson, is a Brazilian footballer who plays as a goalkeeper.

Honours

Club
Palmeiras
Copa do Brasil: 2015, 2020
Campeonato Brasileiro Série A: 2016, 2018
Campeonato Paulista: 2020
Copa Libertadores: 2020, 2021

Individual
 Bola de Prata: 2016
 Campeonato Brasileiro Série A Team of the Year: 2016
Campeonato Paulista Best player: 2018
Campeonato Paulista Team of the year: 2018

References

External links

1981 births
Living people
People from São José dos Campos
Brazilian footballers
Association football goalkeepers
Campeonato Brasileiro Série A players
Campeonato Brasileiro Série B players
Campeonato Brasileiro Série C players
Campinense Clube players
São José Esporte Clube players
Ituano FC players
Guaratinguetá Futebol players
Esporte Clube Juventude players
Oeste Futebol Clube players
Ceará Sporting Club players
Sociedade Esportiva Palmeiras players
América Futebol Clube (MG) players
Footballers from São Paulo (state)